E-6801 is a partial agonist of the 5-HT6 receptor. It enhanced recognition memory and reversed the memory deficits of scopolamine in an object recognition task in a rat model. The mechanism of memory enhancement is due to a combined modulation of cholinergic and glutamatergic neurotransmission.

See also
 E-6837

References

5-HT6 agonists
Anorectics
Imidazoles
Chloroarenes
Sulfonamides
Thiazoles
Tryptamines